The 2016–17 season was the 90th season in ACF Fiorentina's history and their 79th in the top-flight of Italian football. Fiorentina competed in Serie A, the Coppa Italia, and the UEFA Europa League.

The club continued its league regression under Paulo Sousa, finishing eighth after an average league campaign, while also being eliminated in the Coppa Italia in the quarter-finals. However perhaps the poorest result of the season was Fiorentina's elimination from the UEFA Europa League in the round of 32 by German club Borussia Mönchengladbach; after winning the first leg 1–0 in Germany and taking a 2–0 lead at home in the second leg, the team managed to concede four straight goals, losing 4–3 on aggregate.

The season was Sousa's second and last in charge of the team, as his contract was not renewed for the 2017–18 season.

Players

Squad information
Last updated on 28 May 2017
Appearances include league matches only

Transfers

In

Loans in

Out

Loans out

Pre-season and friendlies

Competitions

Overall

Last updated: 28 May 2017

Serie A

League table

Results summary

Results by round

Matches

Coppa Italia

UEFA Europa League

Group stage

Knockout phase

Round of 32

Statistics

Appearances and goals

|-
! colspan=14 style="background:#9400D3; color:#FFFFFF; text-align:center"| Goalkeepers

|-
! colspan=14 style="background:#9400D3; color:#FFFFFF; text-align:center"| Defenders

|-
! colspan=14 style="background:#9400D3; color:#FFFFFF; text-align:center"| Midfielders

|-
! colspan=14 style="background:#9400D3; color:#FFFFFF; text-align:center"| Forwards

|-
! colspan=14 style="background:#9400D3; color:#FFFFFF; text-align:center"| Players transferred out during the season

Goalscorers

Last updated: 28 May 2017

Clean sheets

* Includes one shared clean sheet against Chievo.

Last updated: 28 May 2017

Disciplinary record

Last updated: 28 May 2017

References

ACF Fiorentina seasons
Fiorentina
Fiorentina